Padman Surasena is a Supreme Court Judge in Sri Lanka appointed to the highest court by the Constitutional Council (Sri Lanka) on January 9, 2019.

References

Living people
Puisne Justices of the Supreme Court of Sri Lanka
Sinhalese judges
Year of birth missing (living people)